The Qatar National Convention Centre (QNCC) is located in Gharafat Al Rayyan, on the Dukhan Highway in Doha, Qatar. The convention centre is a member of the Qatar Foundation for Education, Science and Community Development and is situated on Qatar Foundation’s 2,500-acre campus alongside the Sidra Medical and Research Center, Qatar Science & Technology Park, Weill Cornell Medical College in Qatar, Texas A&M, and Georgetown University, among others. 

QNCC was officially opened on 4 December 2011. It was the first of its kind being built to the gold certification standard of the U.S. Green Building Council’s Leadership in Energy and Environment Design (LEED). Designed by Arata Isozaki in partnership with RHWL Architects, the building is designed to operate efficiently with innovations such as water conservation and energy-efficient fixtures, and it is approximately 32 percent more efficient compared with a similarly designed building that lack such innovations. One of the features is the 3,500 sqm of solar panels providing 12.5 percent of the Centre's energy needs. The exhibition halls are equipped with energy-efficient LED lighting. Many other integrative design elements were included in the building to achieve the highest level of environmental and sustainable standards. QNCC features a conference hall of 4,000 seats theatre style, a 2,300-seat theatre, three auditoria and a total of 52 flexible meetings rooms to accommodate a wide range of events. It also houses 40,000 square metres of exhibition space over nine halls, and is adaptable to seat 10,000 for a conference or banquet. It has held many concerts in the past, some notables include The Script, Ed Sheeran and OneRepublic.

In 2013, QNCC won the “Best Events Venue” at the Middle East Event Awards 2013. The Centre received “Middle East’s Leading Exhibition & Convention Centre” from World Travel Awards; “Best Congress and Convention Centre, Middle East” from Business Destinations Travel Awards (a vanity award); and “Best Convention Centre in Middle East” by MICE Report Awards in 2012.

References

Convention centers in Qatar